William Morris (1834–1896) was a British writer, designer, and socialist.

William, Bill, Willie, or Billy Morris may also refer to:

Arts

Literature
 (1889–1979), writer, archdruid of Wales
William C. Morris (1928/29–2003), American publisher, namesake of the William C. Morris Award
Willie Morris (1934–1999), American writer
William Morris, known as Haldreyn (born 1937), Cornish poet
Captain William Morris, a fictional character in the Richard Sharpe novels

Other arts
W. W. Morris (William Walker Morris, 1832–?), English painter
William Morris (actor) (1861–1936), American actor
William Charles Morris (1874–1940), American cartoonist
William Morris (glass artist) (born 1957), American glass artist
Billy Morris (guitarist), guitarist

Business

Corporations
William Morris Agency, a Hollywood talent agency
William Morris Endeavor, a Hollywood talent agency
William Morris Fine Arts, ex-owner of the Morris Singer foundry

People
William Morris (Canadian businessman) (1786–1858), businessman and political figure in Upper Canada
William E. Morris (railroad executive), LIRR president from 1853 to 1862; see List of railroad executives
William Morris (newspaper owner) (1826–1891), founder of the Swindon Advertiser and great-grandfather of Desmond Morris
William Morris, 1st Viscount Nuffield (1877–1963), British motor manufacturer and philanthropist
William Morris Jr. (1899–1989), American talent agent and president of the William Morris Agency

Military
William W. Morris (1801–1865), American Civil War general
William Morris (British Army officer) (1820–1858), British soldier who rode in the Charge of the Light Brigade
William H. Morris (1827–1900), American Civil War general
William Wilkerson Morris (1843–?), American soldier and Medal of Honor recipient
William Powers Morris (1844–1916), American Civil War Congressional Medal of Honor recipient on List of American Civil War Medal of Honor recipients: M–P
William H. H. Morris Jr. (1890–1971), United States Army general

Places
William C. Morris, Buenos Aires, a town in Argentina

Politics, government, and activism
William Morris (Irish mayor), mayor of Galway, 1527–28
William Morris (British politician) (1811–1877), Liberal MP for Carmarthen Boroughs, and banker
William Ridgley Morris (1811–1889), member of the Pennsylvania State Legislature and consul
William Case Morris (1864 – 1932), British-Argentinian social activist
William Harrington Morris, mayor of Birmingham, Alabama, 1875–1878
William R. Morris (1853–1936), second Public Service Commissioner of New Zealand
William Dowler Morris (1857–1931), mayor of Ottawa
Sir Willie Morris (diplomat) (1919–1982), British diplomat
William S. Morris (1919–1975), Lieutenant Governor of Missouri, 1969–1973
William E. Morris (politician) (1920–2013), founder of the Libertarian Party of Delaware in 1975
Bill Morris (Tennessee politician) (born 1932/33), sheriff and mayor of Shelby County, Tennessee
Bill Morris, Baron Morris of Handsworth (born 1938), Jamaican-born British trade union leader
Bill Morris (Illinois politician), member of the Illinois Senate and Mayor of Waukegan, Illinois

Religion
William Placid Morris (1794–1872), British Catholic Vicar Apostolic of the Cape of Good Hope and Mauritius
William Morris (Baptist minister) (1843–1922), minister in South Wales
William Morris (Irish priest), Dean of Clogher, 1959–1962
William Morris (Church of Scotland minister) (1925–2013), Church of Scotland minister and author
Bill Morris (bishop) (born 1943), Roman Catholic Bishop Emeritus of Toowoomba, Australia

Sports
William George Morris (1847–1935), Royal Engineers defender in the 1878 FA Cup Final
Bill Morris (rugby union, born 1869) (1869–1946), Welsh international rugby union forward
William Morris (English cricketer) (1873–1945), English cricketer
William Morris (Australian cricketer) (born 1918), Australian cricketer
William Morris (British sport shooter), completed in 1908 Olympics
Bill Morris (footballer, born 1888) (1888–1949), English footballer
Billy Morris (soccer), international soccer player, active in United States teams 1922–1931
Bill Morris (footballer, born 1913) (1913–1995), England international football player
Bill Morris (cricketer) (1917–2004), English cricketer
Billy Morris (footballer, born 1918) (1918–2002), Welsh international football player
Billy Morris (footballer, born 1920) (1920–1994), Welsh footballer (Swansea Town, Brighton & Hove Albion)
Bill Morris (basketball) (c. 1920–1995), American basketball player
Bill Morris (Australian rules footballer) (1921–1960), Australian rules footballer
William Morris (American sport shooter) (born 1939), American Olympic sport shooter (1964)
Bill Morris (rugby union, born 1940), Wales international rugby union player
Bill Morris (rugby union, born 1941), Australian-born Welsh international rugby union lock
Speedy Morris (William Morris, born 1942), American college basketball coach
Bill Morris (ice hockey) (born 1949), Canadian former professional ice hockey player
Willie Morris (cricketer) (born 1955), South African cricketer
Hal Morris (William Harold Morris III, born 1965), American baseball player

Others
William O'Connor Morris (1824–1904), Irish county court judge and historian
William Morris, litblogger at A Motley Vision

See also
William Morice (disambiguation)
William Maurice (disambiguation)

Human name disambiguation pages